Ronnie Walter Cunningham (March 16, 1932 – January 3, 2023) was an American astronaut, fighter pilot, physicist, entrepreneur, venture capitalist, and author of the 1977 book The All-American Boys. NASA's third civilian astronaut (after Neil Armstrong and Elliot See), he was a lunar module pilot on the Apollo 7 mission in 1968.

Biography

Early life, education and military career 
Cunningham was born in Creston, Iowa, on March 16, 1932. He graduated from Venice High School in Los Angeles, California, in 1950.

After graduating from high school, Cunningham studied at Santa Monica College until joining the U.S. Navy in 1951. He began flight training in 1952 and served on active duty as a fighter pilot with the U.S. Marine Corps from 1953 until 1956, flying 54 missions as a night fighter pilot in Korea. Armistice discussions were still ongoing when Cunningham initially left for Korea, and the Korean Armistice Agreement was signed just before he arrived. From 1956 to 1975, he served in the United States Marine Corps Reserve, ultimately retiring at the rank of colonel.

Cunningham married the former Lo Ella Irby of Norwalk, California, and had two children, Brian and Kimberley. Walter and Lo Ella eventually divorced. In addition to his sister and his children, he was survived by his second wife, retired Houston businesswoman Dorothy "Dot" Cunningham.

Upon completing his service obligation, Cunningham resumed his studies at Santa Monica College before transferring to the University of California, Los Angeles (UCLA) in 1958. Cunningham received his Bachelor of Arts degree with honors in 1960, and his Master of Arts degree with distinction in 1961, both in physics, from UCLA. He completed all requirements save for the dissertation for a Doctor of Philosophy degree in physics at UCLA during his time at RAND Corporation, where he spent three years prior to his NASA selection.

NASA career 

In October 1963, Cunningham was one of the third group of astronauts selected by NASA. On October 11, 1968, he occupied the Lunar Module Pilot seat for the eleven-day flight of Apollo 7, the first launch of a crewed Apollo mission. The flight carried no Lunar Module and Cunningham was responsible for all spacecraft systems except launch and navigation. The crew kept busy with myriad system tests, including successfully completed test firing of the service module engine and measuring the accuracy of the spacecraft systems. Following the mission, Cunningham went on to head up the Skylab branch of the Flight Crew Directorate and left NASA in 1971.

Cunningham accumulated more than 4,500 hours of flying time, including more than 3,400 in jet aircraft and 263 hours in space.

Later life 
In 1974, Cunningham attended Harvard Business School's six-week Advanced Management Program and later worked as a businessman and investor in a number of private ventures. In 1977, he published The All-American Boys, a reminiscence of his astronaut days. He was also a major contributor to and foreword writer for the 2007 space history book In the Shadow of the Moon. In 2018, Cunningham joined the Back to Space organization as an Astronaut Consultant with the goal of inspiring the next generation to go to Mars.

In 2008, NASA awarded Cunningham the NASA Distinguished Service Medal for his Apollo 7 mission. He became a radio talk-show host and public speaker, worked as a consultant to start-up technology companies, and was chairman of the Texas Aerospace Commission.

Death 
Cunningham died in Houston on January 3, 2023, at age 90, from complications resulting from a fall.

Global warming views 
Cunningham rejected the scientific consensus on climate change. In 2010, he published a discussion paper titled "Global Warming: Facts versus Faith". In an editorial published in the Houston Chronicle on August 15, 2010, Cunningham claimed that the empirical evidence did not support global warming. In 2012, he and other former astronauts and NASA employees sent a critical letter to the agency highlighting what they believed to be "unproven assertions that man-made carbon dioxide was a major factor in global warming."

Organizations 
Cunningham was an associate fellow of the American Institute of Aeronautics and Astronautics, fellow of the American Astronautical Society, and member of the Society of Experimental Test Pilots, American Geophysical Union, Explorers Club, Sigma Pi Sigma and Sigma Xi, Association of Space Explorers, CO2 Coalition, Houston American Revolution Bicentennial Commission, Aviation Subcommittee, Houston Chamber of Commerce, Earth Awareness Foundation, and National Association of Small Business Investment Companies.

Awards and honors 
Cunningham was a recipient of numerous national and international honors, including:

 NASA Distinguished Service Medal
 NASA Exceptional Service Medal
 AIAA Haley Astronautics Award, 1969
 UCLA Professional Achievement Award, 1969
 Special Trustees Award, National Academy of Television Arts and Sciences (Emmy Award), 1969
 Medal of Valor, American Legion, 1975
 Outstanding American Award, American Conservative Union, 1975
 Listed in Who's Who
 George Haddaway Award, 2000
 Houston Hall of Fame
 International Space Hall of Fame, inducted in 1983
 U.S. Astronaut Hall of Fame, inducted in 1997
 Iowa Aviation Hall of Fame, inducted in 2003
 International Air & Space Hall of Fame, San Diego Air & Space Museum, inducted in 2011.
 National Aviation Hall of Fame, Inducted in 2018.

In popular culture 
In the 1998 HBO miniseries From the Earth to the Moon, Cunningham is portrayed by Fredric Lehne.

See also 
 The Astronaut Monument

References

Further reading

External links 

 
 Interview with Walter Cunningham for NOVA series: To the Moon WGBH Educational Foundation, raw footage, 1998
 
 
 Cunningham at Encyclopedia of Science
 Walt Cunningham on The George Jarkesy Show 

1932 births
2023 deaths
1968 in spaceflight
20th-century American businesspeople
21st-century American physicists
Accidental deaths from falls
Accidental deaths in Texas
American astronauts
American investors
Apollo 7
Apollo program astronauts
Aviators from Iowa
Emmy Award winners
Military personnel from Iowa
NASA civilian astronauts
NASA people
People from Creston, Iowa
Recipients of the NASA Distinguished Service Medal
Recipients of the NASA Exceptional Service Medal
Santa Monica College alumni
United States Astronaut Hall of Fame inductees
United States Marine Corps officers
University of California, Los Angeles alumni
Venice High School (Los Angeles) alumni